HNLMS Banckert was a  of the Royal Netherlands Navy, named after the 17th century Dutch admiral Adriaen Banckert. It served during World War II.

Service history

Banckert was laid down on 15 August 1928, at the Burgerhout's Scheepswerf en Machinefabriek, in Rotterdam. She was launched on 14 November 1929. The ship was commissioned on 14 November 1930.

On 20 October 1936, the cargo ship Van der Wijck, of the Koninklijke Paketvaart Maatschappij, capsized in the Java Sea. Banckert was among a large rescue mission sent to recover the crew of Van der Wijck. The rescue mission was able to save 210 sailors from Van der Wijck out of a crew of 261.

On 14 February 1942, Banckerts sister, got stuck on a reef and her crew was forced to set the ship on fire. The crew was later taken on board Banckert. Both ships were involved in an action to counter a Japanese invasion of Palembang.

Between 24 and 28 February 1942, the ship was attacked by Japanese planes while docked at Port of Tanjung Perak and damaged to the point that she had to be scuttled on 2 March of that year. On 20 March 1944, the Japanese decided to raise the ship and the repair her at Cavite Naval Base, and on 20 April 1944 they reclassified her as Patrol Boat No. 106. However, the repairs were never finished, and after the war Banckert was reacquired and eventually expended as a target ship in the Madura Strait in September 1949.

References

Admiralen-class destroyers
Ships built in Rotterdam
1929 ships
World War II destroyers of the Netherlands
Maritime incidents in March 1942
Scuttled vessels
Naval ships of the Netherlands captured by Japan during World War II
World War II patrol vessels of Japan
Ships sunk as targets